Friday John Imaekhai was an Anglican archbishop in Nigeria until his retirement in 2020.

Imaekhai was Bishop of Esan from 2000 to 2020 and  Archbishop of Bendel from 2010 to 2020.

He was elected as Archbishop of Bendel on 29 October 2009 at the Episcopal synod of the Church of Nigeria Anglican Communion held at the Basilica of Grace Apo in Gudu district of the Anglican Diocese of Abuja.

Notes

Living people
Anglican bishops of Esan
Anglican archbishops of Bendel
21st-century Anglican archbishops
21st-century Anglican bishops in Nigeria
Year of birth missing (living people)